The 2015 Nigerian Senate election in Bayelsa State was held on March 28, 2015, to elect members of the Nigerian Senate to represent Bayelsa State. Foster Ogola  representing Bayelsa West, Ben Murray-Bruce representing Bayelsa  East and: Emmanuel Paulker representing Bayelsa Central all won on the platform of the People's Democratic Party.

Overview

Summary

Results

Bayelsa Central 
People's Democratic Party candidate Emmanuel Paulker won the election, defeating All Progressives Congress candidate Aganaba Steven and other party candidates.

Bayelsa West 
People's Democratic Party candidate Foster Ogola won the election, defeating All Progressives Congress candidate Eddi Julius and other party candidates.

Bayelsa East 
People's Democratic Party candidate Ben Murray-Bruce won the election, defeating All Progressives Congress candidate Timipre Sylva and other party candidates.

References 

March 2015 events in Nigeria
Bayelsa State
2015 Bayelsa State elections
Bayelsa State Senate elections